Spijk may refer to several villages in the Netherlands:

 Spijk, Groningen, in the municipality of Eemsdelta, Groningen
 Spijk, North Brabant, in the municipality of Altena, North Brabant
 Spijk, West Betuwe, in the municipality of West Betuwe, Gelderland
 Spijk, Zevenaar, in the municipality of Zevenaar, Gelderland